Eifel was a German fishing trawler that was built in 1929 as Marie Richardson. Renamed Eifel in 1936, she was requisitioned by the Kriegsmarine in the Second World War for use as a Vorpostenboot, serving as V 313 Eifel. Returned to her owners post-war, she was scrapped in 1955.

Description
The engine was built by C. D. Holmes & Co., Hull, Yorkshire, United Kingdom. It was rated at 96nhp. It drove a single screw propeller.

History
Marie Richardson was built by NV IJsselweft, Gorinchem, South Holland, Netherlands for Deutsche Fischerei Gesellschaft AG, Germany. She was launched in 1929 and completed in March 1930. The fishing boat registration PG 392 was allocated, as were the Code Letters KRSF. Her port of registry was Wesermünde In 1934, her Code Letters were changed to DFBE. 
In 1936, she was sold to the Norddeutscher Hochseefisherei.

She was scheduled to have participated in Unternehmen Seelöwe in 1940. On 20 April 1941, Eifel was requisitoned by the Kriegsmarine for use as a vorpostenboot. She was allocated to 3 Vorpostenflotille as V 313 Eifel. In 1945, she was returned to her owners. She arrived at  W. Ritscher, Hamburg for scrapping on 28 December 1954.

References

Sources

1929 ships
Ships built in the Netherlands
Fishing vessels of Germany
Steamships of Germany
Auxiliary ships of the Kriegsmarine
Steamships of West Germany
Fishing vessels of West Germany